Pseudochazara panjshira is a species of butterfly in the family Nymphalidae. It is confined to Kopet-Dagh, the Hindu Kush and Alai. The habitat consists of dry stony slopes at altitudes ranging from 1,500 to 3,500 meters.

Flight period 
The species is univoltine and is on wing from July to August.

Food plants
Larvae feed on grasses.

Subspecies
Pseudochazara panjshira panjshira
Pseudochazara panjshira kopetdaghi Dubatolov, 1989 (Kopet-Dagh)
Pseudochazara panjshira badachshana Wyatt & Omoto, 1966 (Alai, Pamirs)

References

 Satyrinae of the Western Palearctic - Pseudochazara panjshira

Pseudochazara
Butterflies described in 1966